Pedro Luis de Borja, Duke of Spoleto and Marquess of Civitavecchia (1432 – 26 September 1458) was the younger brother of Rodrigo Borgia and nephew of Cardinal Alonso de Borja, who in 1455 became Pope Callixtus III. He was called Don Pedro Luis.

Biography
Although he was not a priest but a layman, soon after the elevation of his uncle to the papacy he was loaded with several offices and honours. In the spring of 1456 he was named Captain-General of the Church and castellan of Sant'Angelo, in the autumn of the same year the Pope made him Governor of Terni, Narni, Todi, Rieti, Orvieto, Spoleto, Foligno, Nocera, Assisi, Amelia, Civita Castellana, and Nepi, and at the beginning of 1457 the governorships of the provinces of Patrimony and Tuscany were added to these. In the same time his older brother Rodrigo Borgia was created Cardinal Deacon, Commander-in-Chief of the papal troops and Vice-Chancellor of the Holy Roman Church, while another relative Luis Juan del Mila y Borja was also elevated to the cardinalate. Such rapid promotions of young relatives of the Spanish Pope Callixtus III were criticised by many older cardinals (e.g. Domenico Capranica) and met also with opposition of rather xenophobic Roman populace. Particularly Orsini family opposed Borgias. Their enmity towards them increased when Don Pedro Luis was sent to recover for the Church some fortresses kept by Orsinis, and on 19 August 1457 was appointed Prefect of Rome in succession to Antonio Orsini. To counterbalance Orsinis, Callixtus III aligned himself with Colonna family, opponents of Orsinis, but the plan of the marriage of Don Pedro Luis with Colonna had never been realized.

It was said that Pope Callixtus III wanted to make him Emperor of Constantinople after its recovering from the Turks.

Don Pedro Luis was hated by Romans, as almost all relatives and allies of Callixtus III, called "Catalans" due to their Spanish origin. On 6 August 1458, the day his uncle Pope died, he had to fly away from Rome because an open revolt against "Catalans" had broken up. He died en route at Civitavecchia, left by almost all of his companions, being only 26 years old.

Descendance 
He married in 1450 Ana Borboun y Saminerez-Guerra,Spanish noble,he had a son with her, Zosef Llancol Escriva,born in 1457 ,died in 1505.

Ancestry

Notes

References
Ludwig von Pastor, History of the Popes vol. 2, p. 460-478

1432 births
1458 deaths
Pedro Luis
Papal family members
Captains General of the Church